Dorotheus or Dorotheos is a male given name from Greek Dōrótheos, meaning "God's Gift", from  (dōron), "gift" +  (theós), "god". Its feminine counterpart is Dorothea, (Dorothy). Theodore means the same, with the root words in reverse order.

Linguistic variants
Greek: Dorotheos (Δωρόθεος)
Latin: Dorotheus
English: Dorotheus
Russian: Dorofei (Дорофей)
Serbian: Dorotej (Доротеј)
Czech:  Dorota, Dora fem.

People
 Dorotheos (sculptor) (5th century BC), of Argos, to whom Kresilas was pupil
 Dorotheus of Sidon (fl. 75), Hellenistic astrologer
 Dorotheus of Tyre (ca. 255 – 362), Christian presbyter and later bishop of Tyre
 St. Dorotheus (martyr), who was martyred with Gorgonius and Peter in the 4th century
 Dorotheus (poet) (fl. 4th-century), Christian poet, known for The Vision of Dorotheus.
 Dorotheus of Antioch, (c. 388 – 407), Arian Archbishop of Constantinople 
 Dorotheus (jurist) (fl. 534), Byzantine jurist who helped draft the Justinian Code
 Dorotheus of Gaza (505–565), monastic father
 Pope Peter IV of Alexandria, also known as Dorotheos (ruled in 565–569)
 Dorotheus of Hilandar (fl. 1356–1382), protos of Mount Athos
 Dorotheus I of Athens, metropolitan of Athens from 1388 to 1392
 Dorotheos II of Trebizond, metropolitan of Trebizond from 1472
 Dorotheos of Ohrid, 15th-century bishop
 Dorotheus IV Ibn Al-Ahmar (d. 1611), Patriarch of Antioch from 1604 to 1611.
 Dorotheus of Mount Sinai and Raithu, Archbishop of Mount Sinai and Raithu
 Archbishop Dorotheus of Athens, Archbishop of All Greece 1956–1957
 Dorotheos of Adrianople
 Dorotheos the Younger
 Dorotheos Polykandriotis, Church of Greece 
 Pseudo-Dorotheus, 3rd-century Christian writer
 Pseudo-Dorotheos of Monemvasia, 17th-century Greek chronicler 
 Dorotheus (magister militum), Byzantine military leader

See also 
 Dorothea (disambiguation), Greek female given name
 Dorothy, English variant
 Dorotheus (weevil), a beetle genus in the tribe Cylydrorhinini

References

Greek masculine given names